Philip Hersby (born July 25, 1984) is a Danish retired ice hockey defenceman who lastly played for Esbjerg Ishockey Klub of the Danish Metal Ligaen. He played eleven seasons in the Danish top league AL-Bank Ligaen, as well as participated in three Ice Hockey World Championships as a member of the Denmark men's national ice hockey team.

Career statistics

External links

1984 births
Danish ice hockey defencemen
Esbjerg Energy players
Herlev Eagles players
Herlev Hornets players
Hvidovre Ligahockey players
Living people
Malmö Redhawks players
Nordsjælland Cobras players
Odense Bulldogs players
Tingsryds AIF players